Garm Absard (also Romanized as Garm Ābsard; also known as Garmābsar) is a village in Abarshiveh Rural District, in the Central District of Damavand County, Tehran Province, Iran. At the 2006 census, its population was 899, in 246 families.

References 

Populated places in Damavand County